The sea goat is a legendary aquatic animal described as a creature that is half goat and half fish.

The constellation Capricornus was commonly imagined as a type of sea goat. This has been done since the Bronze Age within Mesopotamia. Then the Babylonians used , 'the goat fish', to symbolize the god Enki.

Greek interpretation
The Greek interpretation of the sea goat comes from the introduction of the Babylonian zodiac. In an attempt to codify the constellation Capricorn within the Greek pantheon, two myths were used as an explanation. One being that the constellation is  Amalthea, the goat that raised Zeus. As thanks for caring for him as a child, Zeus places her amongst the stars. The other being that the sea goat is the wilderness god Pan. The myth goes that Zeus jumped into the river to escape the monster Typhon. He tries to turn himself into a fish while jumping into the river, but he moves too quickly and only his lower half becomes that of a fish. Zeus then engages in combat with the monster. Zeus defeats him, but not without Typhon pulling the muscles out of Zeus’ legs. With the help of Hermes, Pan replaces the damaged muscles. As a reward for healing him, Zeus placed Pan in the sky as Capricorn. The god Aegipan is also depicted in Greek art as a sea goat.

Jewish tradition
In Jewish oral history, sea goats are mentioned. The story goes that one day all the creatures of the sea must offer themselves to the monster Leviathan. In another, a sailor encountered a sea goat while far at sea. On its horns was carved the sentence,  translated as "I am a little sea-animal, yet I traversed three hundred parasangs to offer myself as food to the leviathan."

See also
Hippocampus
Ichthyocentaurs
Mermaid
Myotragus

References

Greek legendary creatures
Jewish legendary creatures
Mythological caprids
Mythological aquatic creatures
Mythological hybrids
Capricorn in astrology